The Rubicon River, an inland perennial river of the Goulburn Broken catchment, part of the Murray-Darling basin, is located in the lower South Eastern Highlands bioregion and Northern Country/North Central regions of the Australian state of Victoria. The headwaters of the Rubicon River rise on the western slopes of the Victorian Alps and descend to flow into the Goulburn River.

Location and features

The river descends  over its  course.

The Rubicon Hydroelectric Scheme, a small run-of-the-river hydroelectric scheme, is located at the mouth of the Royston River. The Rubicon River is impounded by a  concrete arch dam diverts water into the  Rubicon aqueduct to the site of the Royston Power Station, where it collects water diverted from the Royston River. Water then travels a further  to the Rubicon Power Station forebay. The Rubicon Power Station has two  horizontal single-jet Pelton wheel generators. Further power stations are located at the  Lower Rubicon Power Station, some  down-river and at the  Rubicon Falls Power Station. Established in 1924, the Scheme is on the Victorian Heritage Register and the Register of the National Estate.

Etymology
The river was at first probably called Rubicon Creek. The naming of the river first appeared on Thomas Ham's Map of Australia Felix in 1847, and was listed by Wells in 1848. The name of the river is derived from the Latin word rubico, a reddish river in central Italy, perhaps the modern Fiumicino or Pisciatello, at the border of Cisalpine Gaul and Italy.

See also

References

Goulburn Broken catchment
Rivers of Hume (region)
Tributaries of the Goulburn River